Bahjani is an urban locality and mouza, in Nalbari district, Assam, India. Bahjani includes the Pub Bahjani, Uttar Bahjani, and Dakshin Bahjani areas, with a total of 25 villages. As per the 2001 census the Bahjani locality had a population of 44,472 people. As per the 2011 census the Bahjani locality has a population of 47,696 people.

Bahjani has a vast history related to education, social and agricultural, militancy, agitation, and political.

History 
During the British rule in India, Bahjani was a Tehsil. During the British Raj several people including Madan Barman and Rawta Koch (both killed in British police firing) from Bahjani area were involved in the Quit India Movement.

Villages under Bahjani 
The following is the list of villages under Bahjani mouza.

References 

Neighbourhoods in Assam
Villages in Nalbari district